Constance McCashin (born June 18, 1947) is an American psychotherapist and former actress, best known for her role as Laura Avery Sumner in the CBS prime time soap opera, Knots Landing.

Early life and career
McCashin was born in Chicago. She is best known for her role as Laura Avery Sumner on the prime time drama Knots Landing, which she played from the show's debut in 1979 until 1987 when the character died of a brain tumor and her funeral was the basis of the show's 200th episode. McCashin's character was written-out of the show due to cost-cutting measures along with fellow actress Julie Harris. McCashin explained to The Boston Globe in 2009 stating, "I was very hurt the way I was let go for financial reasons. I wish they'd handled my demise better".

During her career, McCashin starred in a number of made for television movies. She appeared in several episodes of the CBS sitcom Brooklyn Bridge playing the role of Rosemary Monahan. She was a contestant on the Dick Clark-hosted $25,000 Pyramid and would later appear as a panelist on Super Password. She made her final screen appearance playing supporting role in the 1999 comedy film The Out-of-Towners.

McCashin appeared at the TV Land awards in April 2009 for the 30th anniversary celebration of Knots Landing. Other Knots Landing actors who appeared with her included Kevin Dobson, Lisa Hartman Black, Michele Lee, Donna Mills, Don Murray, Michelle Phillips, Ted Shackelford, and Joan Van Ark.

New career
After her Hollywood career, McCashin became a social worker and therapist who specializes in the treatment of eating disorders and body image issues.

Personal life
McCashin lives in Massachusetts with her husband, producer Sam Weisman. They have two children: Marguerite Weisman, an editorial assistant at HarperCollins; and Daniel Weisman, who as an infant played McCashin's character's baby on Knots Landing, and is now a Vice President in private wealth at Alliancebernstein but worked as a music manager for 15 years managing Capital Cities , Wale, Mike Posner and Big Sean.

Filmography

References

External links

1947 births
American film actresses
American soap opera actresses
American television actresses
Contestants on American game shows
Living people
Actresses from Chicago
20th-century American actresses
21st-century American women